Galcerand de Vilanova was Bishop of Urgel and ex-officio Co-Prince of Andorra from 1388 to 1396 and again from 1396 to 1415.

14th-century Princes of Andorra
15th-century Princes of Andorra
Bishops of Urgell
Year of birth missing
Year of death missing
14th-century Roman Catholic bishops in Castile
15th-century Roman Catholic bishops in Castile